Alucita trachydesma is a moth of the family Alucitidae. It is found in Bolivia.

References

Moths described in 1929
Alucitidae
Moths of South America
Taxa named by Edward Meyrick